Lathyrus pratensis or meadow vetchling, yellow pea, meadow pea and meadow pea-vine, is a perennial legume that grows to 1.2 m in height.

The hermaphrodite flowers are pollinated by bees. As a perennial, this plant reproduces itself over many years, spreading out from the point it was introduced, especially in damp grassy areas. This plant has been propagated in the past as animal fodder.

Lathyrus pratensis is also a host plant for ovipositioning of the wood white butterfly (Leptidea sinapis).

Description
The leaves are alternate with short stalks and large stipules. The leaf blades are pinnate with a single pair of broad lanceolate leaflets with blunt tips, entire margins and a terminal unbranched tendril. These have five sepals and five petals and are irregular. The uppermost petal is known as the "standard", the lateral two as the "wings" and the lowest two are joined to form the "keel". There are ten stamens and a single carpel. The fruit is a long black pod. This plant flowers from June to August.

Distribution and habitat
Meadow vetchling is native to Europe and Asia, but has been introduced to other parts of the world. In the United States, this plant is found primarily in the northwestern states of Oregon and Alaska. Its typical habitat is rough grassy places, broad-leaved woodland, forest margins, hedgerows and banks where it uses its tendrils to clamber over other vegetation.

References

External links

 Plants For A Future: Lathyrus pratensis 
  More photos

pratensis
Flora of Europe
Flora of Serbia
Plants described in 1753
Taxa named by Carl Linnaeus